St Paul's Presbyterian Church, Hamilton is a congregation of the Presbyterian Church in Canada located at the city centre of Hamilton, Ontario. The church building, designed by renowned architect William Thomas, is federally designated as a National Historic Site in Canada and provincially designated by the province of Ontario as a heritage site under the Ontario Heritage Act.

History

The congregation was founded by Scottish immigrants in 1830, originally named St. Andrew's. The name was changed to St. Paul's in 1873. The building was constructed over four years, from 1854 to 1857. The choir at the west end of St Paul's was extended in 1909, designed by Hugh Vallance. The building was designated a National Historic Site in 1990.

Building features

The church building was designed by William Thomas (architect) in the style of English Gothic revival. The building's exterior is grey limestone which comes for the most part from local Hamilton quarries by stonemason George Worthington. Many windows are adorned with Gothic tracery. The sanctuary is made of dark wood. There is a chancel with rich foliage sculptures on the capitals. The church yard includes a small cemetery.

Architectural historian Marion MacRae assessed the building as "the best Decorated Gothic Revival Church in Ontario".

Steeple

The church has a single steeple made entirely of stone which rises a height of 180 feet. It rises to a height of 100 feet to the top of the parapet line at which point it almost imperceptibly reduces itself into an octagonal spire with lucarnes on alternate sides. The tower and spire display medieval details from the Middle Pointed or Decorated phase of English Gothic (late 13th to early 14th century), including twin, pointed belfry openings on each side of the tower. The corners of the tower are reinforced with buttresses at right angles to the walls. There are narrow angle turrets each with their own delicate spire adorned with crockets and a finial at the top.

It is the largest entirely stone steeple in Canada.

Bells

The bells were used first on Sunday, 11 November 1906. The bells are functional and are played every Sunday morning and on special occasions.

Cross

On the south-east yard the Cross of Sacrifice, a large Celtic cross, was erected in 1921 as a war memorial. It was carved in Scotland and is similar to the ancient crosses in Iona. The arms of the Cross are truncated and the column tapers from its base to the apex. A circle symbolical of a crown or wreath surrounds the arms.

Services and events

The church provides services of worship Sunday mornings and on other special occasions, including weddings. The church participates in the annual "Doors Open" event, a citywide weekend-long event in the autumn which permits tours of historical buildings of Hamilton.

See also

 List of National Historic Sites of Canada in Hamilton, Ontario

References

Churches in Hamilton, Ontario
Churches completed in the 1830s
National Historic Sites in Ontario
19th-century churches in Canada